The Ministry of Education (MOE) (Pha̍k-fa-sṳ: Kau-yuk Phu) is the ministry of the Republic of China (Taiwan) responsible for incorporating educational policies and managing public schools.

Organizational structure

Political departments 
 Department of Planning
 Department of Higher Education
 Department of Technological and Vocational Education
 Department of Lifelong Education
 Department of International and Cross-Strait Education
 Department of Teacher and Art Education
 Department of Information and Technology Education
 Department of Student Affairs and Special Education

Administrative departments 
 Department of Secretarial Affairs
 Department of Personnel
 Department of Civil Service Ethics
 Department of Accounting
 Department of Statistics
 Department of Legal Affairs
 Supervisory Committee Managing Retirement, Compensation, Resignation and Severance Matters for Private School Teachers and Staff

Agencies 
 Sports Administration
 K-12 Education Administration
 Youth Development Administration
 National Academy for Educational Research
 National Central Library
 National Museum of Marine Biology and Aquarium
 National Museum of Natural Science
 National Science and Technology Museum
 National Taiwan Science Education Center
 National Education Radio
 National Library of Public Information
 National Taiwan Library
 National Taiwan Arts Education Center
 National Museum of Marine Science and Technology
 National Sports Training Center

History 
Taiwan's education ministry was rooted as the Ministry of Education, Science, Sports and Culture from the Imperial Japanese government, which took over Taiwan in 1895. During Japanese colonial rule, school attendance for Taiwanese children increased from 3.8% in 1904 to 71.3% in 1943 and literacy in Taiwan became common.  Modern schools were formed with widespread establishment of primary schools while higher schooling for Taiwanese people remained rare and secondary schools and colleges were mostly for Japanese nationals. In special cases many Taiwanese did receive higher schooling and many went to Japan for further studies.

In 2022, in response to complaints from higher-education institutions about the weekly cap on inbound visitors, the MOE reserved extra slots for foreign students to ensure they are not prevented from entering Taiwan.

List of overseas offices 
The following is a list of overseas offices:

List of Ministers 
Political Party:

Relations with UNESCO
Decisions adopted by the Executive Board at its 188th session in 2011, recalling under the Terms of reference of the Committee on Non-Governmental Partners (23 members), taking  into  account  the  Directives  concerning  UNESCO’s  partnership  with  non-governmental organizations, adopted by the General Conference at its 36th session, as well as the following resolutions adopted by the General Conference, that with 21  C/Resolution  7.11,  concerning  international  non-governmental  organizations  maintaining relations with UNESCO and in which bodies or elements linked with the Taiwan authorities are still participating in the name of China.

Access 
The MOE building is accessible by walking distance North East of NTU Hospital Station of the Taipei Metro on the Red Line.

See also

References

External links 

1912 establishments in China
Taiwan
Education
Ministries established in 1912